The Galician alphabet is used for writing the Galician language. According to the modern and official standard, it has 23 letters and 6 digraphs.

As in Portuguese and unlike in Spanish, Galician letter names are of masculine grammatical gender.

The Medieval Galician alphabet, still used today by advocates of reintegrationism, featured the additional letters  /ʃ/ and  /θ/ (or /s/ in areas with sigmatism) as well as the digraphs  /ʎ/,  /ɲ/ and  /s/.

References

Latin alphabets
Galician language